Đorđe Stefanović (also transliterated Djordje; 8 November 1921 – 30 July 2012) was an athlete who competed for Yugoslavia at the 1948 Summer Olympics in London, where he was eliminated in the opening round of the men's 3000 metres steeplechase. He was born in Budapest, Hungary and was a member of AK Partizan.

References

External links
 

1921 births
2012 deaths
Serbian male steeplechase runners
Yugoslav male steeplechase runners
Olympic athletes of Yugoslavia
Athletes (track and field) at the 1948 Summer Olympics